Shandi Sinnamon (born 1952) is an American singer and songwriter.

Career
Shandi was born to a Huguenot family as Shandra Sinnamon in Miami, Florida. After dropping out of high school, she left home for Big Sur, California. Her ambition was to become a singer and songwriter.

After a bicycle accident in L.A., she went back to Florida for recuperation.  While recovering, she studied music and drama at a community college. While she was singing in a local restaurant, a disc jockey noticed her talent and introduced her to Elektra/Asylum Records.

In 1976, she released her first album, Shandi Sinnamon, on Asylum Records.

Around the same time in Los Angeles, California, Mike Chapman discovered her. In 1980, they released her second album Shandi from his Dreamland Records, with Chapman producing.

Shandi and Ronald Magness wrote and performed the song "He's a Dream" that was used in the 1983 film Flashdance, the soundtrack of which won the Grammy Award for Best Album of Original Score in 1984.

She has since written and performed songs for films and TV dramas, including "Tough Love" for the film The Karate Kid, "Living on the Edge" & "Double Trouble" for the film Making the Grade, "Fight to Survive" for the film Bloodsport, "Gotcha", title song for the film Gotcha!, "Seven Day Heaven" for Where the Boys Are '84, "Eyes of Fire" for The Little Drummer Girl, "Wild Roses"  for Echo Park and "Boy of My Dreams" for Tower of Terror, among many others.

TV compositions include: "Leave Yesterday Behind" for the TV drama Leave Yesterday Behind, "Slow Dance" for the movie Can You Feel Me Dancing and sang the theme song Charles in Charge for the 1984-1990 TV series.

In 1985, her song "Making It" (composed by Richie Zito) became a local hit in Japan. She also sang the song "Only a Memory Away" as Sailor Mercury in the English adaptation of the Japanese series Sailor Moon (1995). (See also Sailor Moon soundtracks (USA))

She has worked as a background singer with Todd Rundgren, Bernadette Peters, Hoyt Axton and Johnny Hallyday.

She now lives in Eugene, Oregon.

Discography

Albums
 1976: Shandi Sinnamon
 1980: Shandi
 1980: Leather and Pearls
 1982: Love Ordeal
 1985: Back on the Streets
 1986: Slow Dance
 1986: Damsel in Distress
 1987: Americana
 1987: Little Bird
 1990: Urban Berlin
 1992: Straight One Take
 2004: I'm Packin

Single
 "Making It" 1985

Award
 1984: He's A Dream - Grammy Award for Best Score Soundtrack Album for a Motion Picture, Television or Other Visual Media

External links
The Official Website

[ Allmusic]
Shandi Sinammon radio interview on Rundgren Radio
Flashdance the Movie - Includes Music Credits

1952 births
Living people
American women singer-songwriters
American women pop singers
American people of French descent
Musicians from Miami
Singer-songwriters from Florida
Grammy Award winners
21st-century American women